Agnes Campbell MacPhail (March 24, 1890 – February 13, 1954) was a Canadian politician and the first woman elected to Canada's House of Commons. She served as a Member of Parliament (MP) from 1921 to 1940; from 1943 to 1945 and again from 1948 to 1951, she served as a member of the Legislative Assembly of Ontario, representing the Toronto riding of York East. Active throughout her life in progressive politics, Macphail worked for multiple parties, most prominently the Progressive Party and the Co-operative Commonwealth Federation. She promoted her ideas through column-writing, activist organizing, and legislation.

Background
Agnes Macphail was born to Dougald McPhail and Henrietta Campbell in Proton Township, Grey County, Ontario. Although her surname was spelled "McPhail" at birth, she discovered during a later trip to Scotland that her family's surname had been spelled as "Macphail" and changed her name to reflect this. She was raised in the Methodist Church, but converted to the Reorganized Latter Day Saint church as a teenager. This was the church of her missionary uncle. In later years she joined the United Church of Canada, which had absorbed the Methodist church of her youth.

Macphail attended Owen Sound Collegiate and Vocational Institute for one year. Although she did well, she transferred to Stratford Normal School so she could complete her studies while boarding with a relative. She graduated in 1910 with a second-class teacher's certificate. She applied for five positions and was accepted at all five. She later said that this was not due to her competence but to a scarcity of teachers at the time. She taught in several rural Ontario schools in such communities as Port Elgin, Honeywood, and Newmarket “Roots and branches of Saugeen”, a local history book, states that Agnes MacPhail was the teacher in the Gowanlock School, and would “hoist herself up to the counter top” in the Burgoyne Store and argue politics with the “boys” for hours.

While working in Sharon, Macphail became active politically, joining the United Farmers of Ontario (UFO) and its women's organization, the United Farm Women of Ontario. She also became a columnist for the Farmer's Sun around this time.

As with many prominent people of the era, Macphail was an ardent supporter of eugenics.

Federal politics
After amendments to the Elections Act by the Conservative federal government in 1919, Macphail was elected to the House of Commons as a member of the Progressive Party of Canada for the electoral district of Grey Southeast in the 1921 federal election. She was the first female MP in Canadian history. She was re-elected in the 1925, 1926, and 1930 federal elections.

Macphail objected to the Royal Military College of Canada in 1924 on the grounds that it taught snobbishness and provided a cheap education for the sons of the rich; in 1931 she objected to government support for the college as she opposed it on pacifist grounds.

As a radical member of the Progressive Party, Macphail joined the socialist Ginger Group, a faction of the Progressive Party that later formed  Co-operative Commonwealth Federation (CCF). She became the first president of the Ontario CCF in 1932. However, she left the CCF in 1934 when the United Farmers of Ontario pulled out over fears of Communist influence in the Ontario CCF. While Macphail was no longer formally a CCF member, she remained close to the CCF MPs and often participated in caucus meetings. The CCF did not run candidates against Macphail in her three subsequent federal campaigns.

In the 1935 federal election, Macphail was again elected, this time as a United Farmers of Ontario–Labour MP for the newly formed Grey—Bruce riding. She was allowed to use the party's name, even after it stopped being a political organization in 1934.  She was always a strong voice for rural issues. Macphail was also a strong advocate for penal reform and her efforts contributed to the launch of the investigative Archambault Commission in 1936. The final report became the basis for reform in Canadian penitentiaries following World War II. Macphail's concern for women in the criminal justice system led her, in 1939, to found the Elizabeth Fry Society of Canada, named after British reformer Elizabeth Fry.

Causes she championed included pensions for seniors and workers' rights. Macphail was also the first Canadian woman delegate to the League of Nations in Geneva, Switzerland, where she worked with the World Disarmament Committee. Although a pacifist, she voted for Canada to enter World War II.

In the 1940 election, she was defeated. With the death of United Reform MP for Saskatoon City, Walter George Brown, a few days after the election, Macphail was recruited by the United Reform Movement to run in the by-election to fill the seat. On August 19, she was defeated by Progressive Conservative candidate Alfred Henry Bence. He received 4,798 votes, while Macphail placed second with 4,057 votes. It was her last federal campaign as a candidate.

Journalist

Macphail was a frequent contributor to newspapers in Grey County such as the Flesherton Advance and Markdale Standard, often acting as a correspondent or ambassador to the rest of the country. She wrote dispatches from Parliament about political news of interest to the rural communities back home, and contributed columns when she travelled and spoke to citizens in other regions. She also wrote a number of pieces for The Farmer's Sun, an Ontario progressive weekly, including a number of reminiscences about rural Ontario history.

Out of office, she wrote agricultural columns for The Globe and Mail newspaper in Toronto and contributed pieces about politics to the Newmarket Era.

Following a family tragedy in her home town, Macphail moved to the Toronto suburb of East York, Ontario and rejoined the Ontario CCF in 1942 becoming its farm organizer.

Provincial politics
In the 1943 provincial election, Macphail was elected to the Legislative Assembly of Ontario as a member of the Ontario CCF representing the suburban Toronto riding of York East. She and Rae Luckock were the first women elected to the Ontario Legislature. She was the first woman sworn in as an Ontario Member of Provincial Parliament (MPP). Although defeated in the 1945 provincial election, she was elected again in the 1948 election.  Macphail was responsible for Ontario's first equal-pay legislation, passed in 1951, but was unable to continue her efforts when she was defeated in elections later that year. At that time, Macphail was barely able to support herself through journalism, public speaking and organizing for the Ontario CCF.

Macphail was eager to see more women in politics. She explained: "Most women think politics aren't lady-like. Well, I'm no lady. I'm a human being."

Macphail never married. She died February 13, 1954, aged 63, in Toronto, just before she was to have been offered an appointment to the Senate of Canada. She is buried in Priceville, Ontario, with her parents and Gertha Macphail, one of her two sisters.

Electoral record

Federal: Saskatoon City

Federal: Grey—Bruce

Federal: Grey Southeast

|}

|}

|}

|}

Legacy

In 1968, when Flesherton High School was replaced by Grey Highlands Secondary School, the old high school was converted to an elementary school and named Macphail Memorial Elementary School. This building was replaced with a new school of the same name in 2006.
In 1981, a public school in Scarborough, Ontario was named after her.
In 1993, honouring the 50th anniversary of Macphail's election to the Ontario legislature, Michael Prue, the mayor of East York, declared March 24 would annually be known as Agnes Macphail Day.
In 1994, East York council established the Agnes Macphail Award. The award is given out annually to "a resident of East York who has made outstanding contributions in the area of equality rights and social justice and who has exemplified and continued Macphail's tradition of leadership."
In 1997, East York inaugurated the annual Agnes Macphail public speaking contest for students. In addition, there are a number of sites and endeavours named for her in East York, including the Agnes Macphail Parkette, located at the corner of Mortimer Street and Pape Avenue; the Agnes Macphail Playground, Agnes MacPhail Youth Resource Centre and the Agnes MacPhail Food Bank (all located at 444 Lumsden Avenue).
In 1999, a new townhome development was built by Brownstone Homes and named a street after her, Macphail Ave, also at Pape & Mortimer.
In 2005, in a contest run by former Ontario MPP Marilyn Churley, Agnes Macphail was voted as the Greatest Ontario Woman.
On June 24, 2006, a cairn and bronze bust commemorating Agnes Macphail's life was unveiled in Hopeville, Ontario. The same year, highway signs labelled "You are now entering Agnes Macphail Country" were placed at the eastern approach to the hamlet of Ceylon, at the intersection of Grey Roads 4 and 14 (known locally as "Six Corners"), and on Grey Road 9, east of Hopeville. Grey County Road 9 between Highway 6 and Highway 10 was named Agnes MacPhail Road.
An apartment building at 860 Mercer Street in Windsor, Ontario, is named "Agnes Macphail Manor".
 A 2015 episode of Murdoch Mysteries (season 8, episode 17, "Election Day") sees a young Agnes Macphail (played by Zoe Fraser) showing an interest in the suffragette movement.
 She appears on the 2017 "Canada 150" edition of the Canadian ten-dollar note alongside John A. Macdonald, George-Étienne Cartier and James Gladstone and is the first woman other than the sovereign to have a permanent spot on Canadian currency.

Archives 
There is an Agnes Macphail fonds at Library and Archives Canada. Archival reference number is R4413.

References and notes

Notes

References

External links

 
 The Canadian Encyclopedia, Agnes Macphail
 Agnes Macphail Website and Digital Collection
 Celebrating Women's Achievements – Agnes Campbell Macphail
 
 
 CBC Digital Archives – CCF's Agnes Macphail and the 1948 Ontario election, radio address by Macphail.

1890 births
1954 deaths
Canadian women activists
Canadian Christian pacifists
Canadian feminists
Canadian members of the Community of Christ
Canadian people of Scottish descent
Canadian socialist feminists
Women members of the House of Commons of Canada
20th-century Canadian politicians
Ontario Co-operative Commonwealth Federation MPPs
Ginger Group MPs
Labour MPs in Canada
Members of the United Church of Canada
People from Grey County
Persons of National Historic Significance (Canada)
Progressive Party of Canada MPs
United Farmers of Ontario MPs
Women MPPs in Ontario
Converts to Mormonism from Methodism
20th-century Canadian women politicians
Mormon feminists
Canadian activists
Women's International League for Peace and Freedom people